LaVon Brazill (born March 15, 1989) is a former American football wide receiver. He was drafted in the sixth round of the 2012 NFL Draft by the Indianapolis Colts, and released after his second suspension for violating the league's substance abuse policy.

College career
Brazill played college football at Ohio from 2007 to 2011 under head coach Frank Solich.

Professional career
He was selected in the sixth round with the 206th overall pick in the 2012 NFL Draft by the Indianapolis Colts. He caught his first career reception in a Week 1 loss to the Chicago Bears, on a 10-yard pass from fellow rookie Andrew Luck. Brazill caught his first touchdown, a 42-yarder against the Detroit Lions in a 35–33 win on December 2, 2012. On June 24, 2013, he was suspended for the first 4 games of the 2013 season for violating the substance policy.

Brazill had his first multi-touchdown game against the Cincinnati Bengals on December 8, 2013. He recorded three catches for 53 yards and 2 touchdowns. He had his first playoff multi-touchdown game in the AFC Divisional Game on January 11, 2014, against the New England Patriots. On July 3, 2014, Brazill was suspended indefinitely for his second violation of the substance policy. The Colts cut Brazill on July 11, 2014.

Toronto Argonauts
Brazill signed to the practice squad with the Toronto Argonauts on August 27, 2014. He was promoted to the active roster on August 31, 2014. He was waived on November 4, 2014.

Orlando Predators
On November 23, 2015, Brazill was assigned to the Orlando Predators of the Arena Football League (AFL). On April 11, 2016, Brazill was placed on recallable reassignment by the team.

Career statistics

Professional

College

References

External links
 
 Ohio Bobcats bio

1989 births
Living people
People from Lake Worth Beach, Florida
Sportspeople from the Miami metropolitan area
Players of American football from Florida
American football wide receivers
Ohio Bobcats football players
Indianapolis Colts players
Orlando Predators players
American players of Canadian football
Canadian football wide receivers
Toronto Argonauts players